Elph or ELPH may refer to:
 Elph (therapsid), an extinct genus of therapsids
 Canon ELPH, a series of cameras
 ELpH, a project of the experimental music band Coil

See also 
 Elf (disambiguation)